Porer Meye is a Bangladeshi drama serial produced by Kazi Riton. The drama is directed by Habib Shakil and starring Intekhab Dinar, Sadia Jahan Prova, Dilara Zaman, Muntaheena Chowdhury Toya, Golam Kibria Tanvir, Shawon, Elora Gohor, Ariya Aritti, Ashraful Ashish, Golam Haider Kislu. This drama serial aired on NTV from 19 January 2020 to 7 March 2021.

Plot
While being a student, Najifa marries Mitul, without her parents’ consent. For this reason Najifa's father disowns her.
However, Najifa's mother-in-law treats Najifa as her own daughter. Najifa also respects her. In the meantime, Najifa and Mitul's daughter Ariana is born. After getting married, Najifa couldn't complete her studies.
When Ariana is only six months old, Mitul gets murdered in a business conflict. Najifa starts a job for the survival of herself, her daughter and her mother-in-law.
Shayan, the son of the owner of the company where Najifa works, falls in love with Najifa. But Najifa does not reciprocate.

Cast
 Intekhab Dinar as Mitul
 Sadia Jahan Prova as Nazifa
 Dilara Zaman as Rabea
 Mumtaheena Chowdhury Toya as Othoi
 Golam Kibria Tanvir as Shawon
 Shawon as Nakkhatra
 Toriqul Islam Tusher as Tusher
 Elora Gohor as Nargis
 Ariya Aritti as Ariana
 Ashraful Ashish as Wasif
 Golam Haider Kislu as Akbar Chowdhury

References

2020s Bangladeshi television series
NTV (Bangladeshi TV channel) original programming